The Datuo class is a class of little known rescue and salvage ships (ARS) built in the People's Republic of China (PRC) for the People's Liberation Army Navy (PLAN). The exact domestic Chinese type designation remain unknown, and this class is identified by its NATO reporting name Datuo class, or 大拖 in Chinese, meaning "big tug". 

Specification:
 Length: 

The Datuo class in PLAN service is designated by a combination of two Chinese characters followed by a three-digit number. The second Chinese character is Tuo (拖), meaning Tug in Chinese, because these ships are rescue tugs, and thus can also be used as tugs. The first Chinese character denotes which fleet the ship is service with, with East (Dong, 东) for East Sea Fleet, North (Bei, 北) for North Sea Fleet, and South (Nan, 南) for South Sea Fleet. However, the pennant numbers may have changed due to the change of Chinese naval ships naming convention. As of 2022, a total of four ships have been identified, plus several more units under construction:

References

Auxiliary ships of the People's Liberation Army Navy
Ships of the People's Liberation Army Navy